Onur Air (often styled OnurAir or Onurair) was a low-cost airline with its headquarters in the Technical Hangar B at Istanbul Atatürk Airport in Yeşilköy, Istanbul, Turkey. It operated mostly domestic scheduled services, as well as charter flights out of its base at Istanbul Airport. As of December 2021, it was forced to suspend all operations until further notice and was declared bankrupt in April 2022.

History

Early years

Onur Air was established on April 14, 1992 and started revenue operations using a wet-leased Airbus A320 with a flight to Ercan in North Cyprus on 14 May of that year. "Onur" means proud, self-esteem in Turkish. Over the next years, the Onurair fleet grew, so that by the end of 1995, it included nine aircraft. Previously its head office was in Florya, Bakırköy, Istanbul.

In 1996, Ten Tour acquired ownership of the airline. By 1997 McDonnell Douglas MD-80 twin-jet airliners had been added to the fleet. Due to a recession, Onur Air had to reduce the size of its fleet to 13 in 1998, and then to nine in 1999. Since then the airline has expanded again. Onur Air also carried out special full charter flights (tourist flights, guest worker flights) for sister tour operators such as Nazar Reisen in Germany and Nazar Travel in Turkey.

Development since the 2000s
In May 2005 the airline was withdrawn from the Luftfahrt-Bundesamt, as serious defects on the Onur Air aircraft had been discovered. As a counter-reaction, Turkey then withdrew the German airlines' landing permits. After protests by the Foreign Office, the entry ban for German aircraft was lifted again. On May 14, the airline's entry permit was withdrawn by the Swiss and French aviation safety authorities. Up until then, Onur Air had been awarded a total of nine certificates by Airbus and Boeing for their maintenance procedures. In the period from July 4 to 6, 2005, the review of the airline was provisionally concluded with a so-called "final meeting" at the home airport of Onur Air in Antalya, in accordance with the requirements from the re-issue of the entry permit.

As of 6 April 2019 all of Onur Air's flights from their former base at Atatürk Airport had been relocated to the new Istanbul Airport.

In August 2019, Onur Air established a new, partly-owned subsidiary named Holiday Europe for leisure flights between Europe and destinations around the Mediterranean. Onur Air provides aircraft and crews for the new brand. In October 2021, the operational license of Holiday Europe has been revoked.

In December 2021, the Turkish aviation authorities did not renew the airline's operational license, suspending all of Onur Air's operations. Beforehand negotiations to regain financial stability in the wake of the COVID-19 pandemic failed. 

In February 2022, Onur Air's last remaining airworthy aircraft had been taken back by its lessor, leaving the airline without a usable fleet. In April 2022, a Turkish court declared the airline bankrupt after legal proceedings of a former employee.

Destinations
As of September 2021, prior to the suspension of its licence, Onur Air offered scheduled flights (excluding charter services) to the following destinations:

Fleet

Current fleet
As of September 2021, prior to the return of nearly the entire fleet to its lessors, the Onur Air fleet consisted of an all Airbus fleet of the following aircraft:

Former fleet
Onur Air has also operated the following aircraft types:

Incidents and accidents
On 17 June 2003, Onur Air Flight 2263, a McDonnell Douglas MD-88 (registration TC-ONP) overshot the runway at Groningen Airport Eelde following an aborted take-off. There were no injuries, but the airline was accused of security breaches.

On 12 May 2005, Onur Air was denied access to Dutch airspace for a month. Several incidents were the cause of the suspension of the airline. Negotiations took place between the Dutch authorities and Onur Air and on 24 May 2005 Onur Air had permission to fly from and to the Netherlands again.

On 1 January 2007, the cargo hold of a McDonnell Douglas MD-88 aircraft burst open upon landing at Atatürk International Airport, spilling luggage onto the runway.

On 7 September 2007, an Airbus A321 aircraft lost cabin pressure on a charter flight from Dalaman Airport to Birmingham Airport, resulting in an emergency landing at Atatürk International Airport. Passenger reports included a smoking engine and broken down oxygen masks.

On 20 August 2011, an Onur Air pilot forgot to contact Munich Air Traffic Control and caused the quick reaction air defence of both Germany and Austria to send four Eurofighter Typhoons to intercept the company's A321.

References

External links

Official website

Defunct airlines of Turkey
Airlines established in 1992
Airlines disestablished in 2022
Turkish companies established in 1992
Companies based in Istanbul
Turkish brands
Low-cost carriers